The 2009–10 Super League Greece was the 74th season of the highest football league of Greece and the fourth under the name Super League. The league consisted of 16 teams. Participants are the 13 best teams from the 2008–09 season and three teams that have been promoted from the Beta Ethniki. On 11 April 2010, Panathinaikos defeated Iraklis 2–0 to secure their 20th Greek title and their first one in six years.

Changes from 2008–09

Promotion and relegation
Teams promoted from 2008–09 Beta Ethniki:
 Champions: Atromitos
 Runners-up: PAS Giannina
 3rd placed team: Kavala

Teams relegated to 2009–10 Beta Ethniki:
 14th placed team: OFI
 15th placed team: Panserraikos
 16th placed team: Thrasyvoulos

Other changes
Due to Greece having ascended in the UEFA league coefficient rankings, the 2009–10 champions will enter 2010–11 UEFA Champions League at the group stage instead of the third qualifying round. Every other European spot remains unchanged, meaning that the winner of the European play-off group will reach the third qualifying round of the Champions League while the runners-up and third-placed team of this group will enter 2010–11 UEFA Europa League.

Team overview

Stadia and locations

Personnel and kits

Managerial changes

Regular season

League table

Results

Play-offs
In the play-off for Champions League, the teams play each other in a home and away round robin. However, they do not all start with 0 points. Instead, a weighting system applies to the teams' standing at the start of the play-off mini-league. The team finishing fifth in the Super League will start the play-off with 0 points. The fifth placed team's end of season tally of points is subtracted from the sum of the points that other teams have. This number is then divided by five to give the other teams the points with which they start the mini-league.

The teams started the play-offs with the following number of points:
 Olympiacos – 4 points ((64–46) / 5 = 3.6, rounded up to 4)
 PAOK – 3 points ((62–46) / 5 = 3.2, rounded to 3)
 AEK Athens – 1 point ((53–46) / 5 = 1.4, rounded to 1)
 Aris – 0 points ((46–46) / 5 = 0)

Top scorers
Source: Galanis Sports Data

Awards

Annual awards
Annual awards were announced on 20 December 2010

Player of the Year  

The Player of the Year awarded to  Djibril Cissé (Panathinaikos)

Foreign Player of the Year  

The Foreign Player of the Year awarded to  Djibril Cissé (Panathinaikos)

Top goalscorer of the Year  

The Top goalscorer of the Year awarded to  Djibril Cissé (Panathinaikos)

Greek Player of the Year  

The Greek Player of the Year awarded to  Vasilis Torosidis (Olympiacos)

Manager of the Year  

The Manager of the Year awarded to  Fernando Santos (PAOK)

Young Player of the Year  
The Young Player of the Year awarded to  Sotiris Ninis (Panathinaikos)

Goalkeeper of the Year  

The Goalkeeper of the Year awarded to  Michalis Sifakis (Aris)

References

External links
Official website 
2009–10 Super League Greece at Soccerway.com

Super League Greece seasons
1
Greece